La Neuville-Chant-d'Oisel is a commune in the Seine-Maritime department in the Normandy region in north-western France.

Geography
The commune is on the border with the department of Eure.

Population

Places of interest
 A memorial to cyclist Jacques Anquetil, who lived here.
 The church of Notre-Dame, dating from the thirteenth century.
 The church of St.Austin dating from the sixteenth century at St. Austin.
 Two châteaux, at La Neuville and at Chant-d'Oisel.
 A house once owned by writer Guy de Maupassant and later by cyclist Jacques Anquetil.
 A seventeenth-century stone cross at the cross-roads.

See also
Communes of the Seine-Maritime department

References

External links

Official website of Neuville-Chant-d'Oisel 

Communes of Seine-Maritime